"This Year's Love" is a song by British singer-songwriter David Gray from his fourth studio album, White Ladder (1998). Originally released as the album's first single on 29 March 1999, it was re-issued on 5 March 2001. The single peaked at number 20 on the UK Singles Chart and number 27 on the Irish Singles Chart.

Gray himself makes an appearance in the film of the same title. "This Year's Love" and a previously unreleased track, "Monday Morning", is featured on the film's soundtrack. "This Year's Love" also appears in the films The Girl Next Door, Crazy/Beautiful, and Wimbledon.

Track listings
UK CD single (1999)
 "This Year's Love"
 "Nightblindness"
 "Over My Head"

UK CD1 and cassette single (2001)
 "This Year's Love" (Strings Remix) – 4:00
 "Flame Turns Blue" – 3:59
 "The Lights of London" – 4:43

UK CD2 (2001)
 "This Year's Love" (16.12.00) – 4:22
 "Roots of Love" – 4:30
 "Tired of Me" – 3:42

Credits and personnel
Credits are lifted from the White Ladder album booklet.

Studio
 Recorded and engineered at Air Studios (London, England)

Personnel
 David Gray – writing, vocals, piano, production
 Craig McClune – bass, production
 Tim Bradshaw – keyboards
 Iestyn Polson – production
 Jon Bailey – recording, engineering

Charts

Certifications

Release history

References

1990s ballads
1998 songs
1999 singles
David Gray (musician) songs
East West Records singles
Music videos directed by David Slade
Songs written by David Gray (musician)